Yuvaraj Dhayalan is an Indian film director.

Career
Yuvaraj Dhayalan hails from Chengalpattu. He joined as an assistant director to director M. Raja for his Tamil film Santosh Subramaniam. He had also assisted Chimbu Deven in the Cowboy film Irumbukkottai Murattu Singam.

He made his directorial debut with the cricket comedy film Potta Potti, starring Sadagophan Ramesh and "Tenaliraman" starring Vadivelu.

Filmography

References

1987 births
Living people
Tamil film directors
Tamil screenwriters
21st-century Indian film directors
People from Kanchipuram district